Walter Bielser (20 May 1929 – 10 August 2004) was a Swiss footballer who played mainly as a forward, but also as a midfielder.

Football career
Bielser played his youth football for FC Pratteln and then moved on to FC Aesch. As senior he played for Biel-Bienne and Lausanne-Sport before he moved to Basel for the first time. After two seasons he again played for Biel-Bienne before returning to Basel. Between 1952 and 1957 Bielser played 106 games for Basel and scored of 32 goals; 66 of these games were in the Nationalliga A, 8 in the Swiss Cup and 32 were friendly games. He scored 19 goals in the domestic league, 3 in the Cup and the other 10 during the test games.

The biggest success in his football career was as Basel won the championship title in the 1952–53 season. During this season Bielser played 21 league games and scored 9 goals for the club. Joint with Walter Bannwart and René Bader, Bielser was the team's second most successful league scorer with 9 goals for the club, behind Josef Hügi with 32.

Private life
Bielser was the eldest of three children. He grew up in Pratteln and did his apprenticeship as a printer. Bielser married Heidi Schillinger and together they had three daughters. In 1960 he made himself self-employed and founded his own printing company, which he ran until his retirement.

Honours
FC Basel
 Swiss League Champion: 1952–53

References

Sources
 Rotblau: Jahrbuch Saison 2017/2018. Publisher: FC Basel Marketing AG. 
 Die ersten 125 Jahre. Publisher: Josef Zindel im Friedrich Reinhardt Verlag, Basel. 
 Verein "Basler Fussballarchiv" Homepage

FC Basel players
FC Biel-Bienne players
FC Lausanne-Sport players
Swiss men's footballers
Association football forwards
1929 births
2004 deaths